Gerry Toutant is an American curler.

Teams

References

External links
 
 Full text of "Sports Illustrated 1966-04-04" (web archive) (page 43, "DOWNFALL OF A STONE-THROWER")

Living people
American male curlers
American curling champions
Year of birth missing (living people)